The Letov ST-4 Aztek is a Czech microlight aircraft that was designed and produced by Letov Kbely of Prague - Letňany, in the 1990s. When it was available, the aircraft was supplied as a complete ready-to-fly aircraft, or as a kit for amateur construction.

In January 2014, the ST-4 was no longer listed as a product of the company.

Design and development
The ST-4 Aztek features a strut-braced high-wing, a two-seats-in-side-by-side configuration enclosed cockpit, fixed tricycle landing gear with wheel pants, a small tailskid and a single engine in tractor configuration.

The aircraft is made from aluminum tubing with fairings made from fibreglass and its flying surfaces are covered in Dacron sailcloth. The wings are supported by V-struts with jury struts and the empennage is cable-braced. The engine is mounted high above the cockpit on the front end of the aluminum tube that acts as the tailboom.

The manufacturer estimated the construction time from the supplied kit as 80 hours.

Operational history
By 1998 the company reported that 26 kits had been sold, and that 15 aircraft were completed and flying.

Specifications (ST-4 Aztek)

References

External links

ST-4 Aztek
1990s Czech and Czechoslovakian sport aircraft
1990s Czech and Czechoslovakian ultralight aircraft
1990s Czech and Czechoslovakian civil utility aircraft
Single-engined tractor aircraft
High-wing aircraft
Homebuilt aircraft